Mississippi Highway 489 (MS 489) is a state highway that runs for  in the eastern part of the US state of Mississippi. The route's south end begins at U.S. Route 80 (US 80) in the Scott County portion of Lake. It almost immediately crosses into Newton County and runs to Conehatta. Following this, MS 489 continues northeast to its terminus at MS 492 in Union. The route, which is also partially designated as the Jason Boyd Memorial Highway, was first established in 1956, and it became fully paved in 1965.

Route description

The southern terminus of MS 489 lies near the eastern edge of Scott County at an intersection with US 80, near Lake High School. From here, the road runs northeast for roughly  before crossing into Newton County and curving north-northeast. Much of the following part of the highway is filled with large, open pastures, until the route enters a forested section about  later. The route passes over a series of creeks, including Tuscolameta Creek and Conehatta Creek, over the next .

In Conehatta, MS 489 bends to the right and continues northeast for another  towards Union. About  from the bend, the highway gains its designation as the Jason Boyd Memorial Highway, which it retains for the next mile. Later, the road crosses over Conehatta Creek again and passes a mix of landscapes and geographic features, including Stamper Pond. Approaching Union, the road becomes Conehatta Road and continues north. It eventually reaches a T-intersection, where the highway turns east on Gum Street, later designated as Main Street, in Union.

Mississippi Highway 489 is legally designated as a state highway in Mississippi Code § 65-3-3.

History
MS 489 first appeared on Mississippi state highway maps in 1956, serving as a connector between US 80 and MS 492. Most of the middle section of MS 489 was unpaved until 1957, at which point only a small gravel section on the northern half of the highway remained. It was not until several years later, in 1965, that the road appeared fully paved on highway maps.

In 2021, a mile-long stretch of MS 489 within Conehatta was designated as the Jason Boyd Memorial Highway, in memory of Mississippi Department of Transportation superintendent Jason Boyd, who was killed two years earlier while removing debris from the highway.

On August 24, 2022, a short section of the highway near Conehatta was completely washed away as a result of major flooding in the area, causing the roadway to be closed. After repairs that involved replacing the roadway, MS 489 reopened a few days later on August 26.

Major intersections

See also

References

External links

489
Transportation in Scott County, Mississippi
Transportation in Newton County, Mississippi